Jan Mojžiš (born 18 June 1996) is a Czech handball player for TV Emsdetten and the Czech national team.

He represented the Czech Republic at the 2020 European Men's Handball Championship.

References

1996 births
Living people
Czech male handball players
Expatriate handball players
Czech expatriate sportspeople in Germany